The EHL Wolves are a non-professional Ice Hockey team based in Lausanne, Switzerland. Ice hockey is quite a popular sport in Switzerland, which is equally reflected at the École hôtelière de Lausanne. The 'EHL Wolves' name of the club was coined in 2010, although the team existed as the 'Ice Hockey Committee' since 2005.

History

Since its inception in 2005, the EHL wolves have won numerous accolades. In 2010, they won the championship of "Ligue Lausannoise de hockey-sur-glace". A high level of training during the 2011-2012 season led to a season with no losses.

In 2005, the club was formed by Rodrigue Benoit, a chef at EHL and former European Hockey League player along with Mr. Chris Norton, former EHL Marketing Director and NHL player. In 2010, the EHL wolves defeated the University of Lausanne (UNIL) in the Junior Elite League in Switzerland to become Champions for the first time, that same year, the EHL's name and logo are decided upon. In 2012, the Wolves won the Junior Elite League a second time. In 2014, Arnaud Barbezat took over the team's captaincy. Still undergoing roster changes, the EHL Wolves dropped further in the rankings. In 2016, the  capitancy passes to Tim Zaggner, and in 2017, it passed to Marco Rosso. On November 3, 2017, the EHL Wolves won the championship a third timea gainst the champions of last two editions of the League HC Monchoisi with a score of 6-3.

Team colors
The Wolves logo is a gray wolf (canis lupus), wild member of the Canidae family. It represents the noble and strong esprit de corps among each individual of the club. This is derived from the reputation of the Ecole hôtelière de Lausanne, being renowned as one of the oldest and best hospitality management school in the world.

Home uniform sweaters are predominantly blue in colour. Awayuniform sweaters are predominantly white.

Current roster

Note: (C) = Captain, (A) = Assistant, G = Goalie, D = Defense, C = Centre, RW = Right Wing, LW = Left Wing

Seasons and records

''Note: Each victory accounts for 2 points. Some points might have been lost for not complying with league regulations.

Past Captains/Presidents
The president of the Ice Hockey Committee at EHL is responsible for the organisation of trainings, official matters with the league and any and all contacts with the university. Since 2015, this role is assigned to two students at the time, in order for tasks to be performed more smoothly.

References

External links
 

Wolves